Adolphe Osselaer (born 14 December 1912, died in a car accident in Afsnee near Ghentjanuary 5fth 1955) was a Belgian wrestler. He competed in the men's Greco-Roman lightweight at the 1936 Summer Olympics.

References

External links
 

1912 births
1955 deaths
Belgian male sport wrestlers
Olympic wrestlers of Belgium
Wrestlers at the 1936 Summer Olympics
Place of birth missing